Ruth Lynn Deech, Baroness Deech, DBE (née Fraenkel; born 29 April 1943) is a British academic, lawyer, bioethicist and politician, most noted for chairing the Human Fertilisation and Embryology Authority (HFEA), from 1994 to 2002, and as the former Principal of St Anne's College, Oxford. Deech sits as a Crossbench peer in the House of Lords (2005–) and chaired the Bar Standards Board (2009–2014).

Early life, family and education
Born in Clapham, London, Deech is the daughter of a historian and journalist, Josef Fraenkel who was born in 1903 in Ustrzyki Dolne in south-east Poland. She states that she comes from a "very culturally Jewish family". Her father "was born in Poland and fled, first to Vienna and then Prague, from the Nazis". He arrived in Britain on 3 September 1939, the day the Allies declared war on Germany. Documents show that he travelled first from Poland to Nazi Germany (Vienna, Prague) and arrived in Great Britain on 3 September 1939. Several other members of their family were murdered in Nazi concentration camps during World War II. Her first cousin is Maurice Frankel, Director of the UK Campaign for Freedom of Information.

She was educated at Christ's Hospital school, when the girls part of the school was located in Hertford. She graduated from St Anne's College, Oxford with a first in Law in 1965.

Career

Deech returned to St Anne's College, Oxford, in 1970 to be a tutorial fellow in Law, a post she retained until 1991 when she was elected principal of the college. She retired in 2004, and was succeeded by Tim Gardam. The college named the Ruth Deech Building, which was completed in 2005, after her.

Deech held many other positions during her career; she served as Senior Proctor of the University of Oxford between 1985 and 1986, as a member of the University's Hebdomadal Council of the UK Human Fertilisation and Embryology Authority from 1994 until 2002, and was appointed to a four-year term as a Governor of the BBC in 2002, the same year that she was made a Dame Commander of the Order of the British Empire (DBE), in recognition of her work at the HFEA.

After leaving St. Anne's, Deech was appointed the first Independent Adjudicator for Higher Education from 2004 to 2008, dealing with the resolution of student complaints at all UK universities.

On 22 July 2005, it was announced by the House of Lords Appointments Commission that she would be made a life peer, sitting as a Crossbencher. On 5 October 2005, she was created Baroness Deech, of Cumnor in the County of Oxfordshire, and introduced in the House of Lords on 25 October 2005. She delivered her maiden speech on 24 November 2005.

In 1999, The Observer newspaper named her as the 107th most powerful person in Britain, and in 2001, Deech was placed at no.26 in Channel 4's "The God List", which ranked "the fifty people of faith in Britain who exercise the most power and influence over our lives". In November 2007, Deech published IVF to Immortality: Controversy in the Era of Reproductive Technology, with co-author Anna Smajdor.

Between 2004 and 2008, Deech was Independent Adjudicator for Higher Education and a Professor of Law at Gresham College in London, where she gave a series of public lectures on family relationships and the law.

Deech has been a Director of JNF-UK
In December 2016 Deech argued that Jewish students at UK universities were subject to increasing anti-Semitism. She is a Patron of the activist group UK Lawyers for Israel.

In June 2020, Baroness Deech accused Secretary of State for Housing, Communities and Local Government Robert Jenrick of breaching "the guidance on planning propriety" over his management of a planning application to build a national Holocaust memorial, which she described as controversial.

Returned family property
In 2008, it emerged that Eugeniusz Waniek, a 101-year-old Polish artist and art professor living in Kraków, had in his possession a set of silver cutlery which had once belonged to Deech's father's family, the Fraenkels. Waniek had been a Polish Christian neighbour and friend of the Fraenkels in pre-war Ustrzyki Dolne, a small town near the Polish/Ukrainian border. Deech's grandfather, Moses Fraenkel, owned an oil refinery there had been a long-serving mayor of the town.

Nazi German troops raided Ustrzyki Dolne in September 1942, rounding up the town's large Jewish population. Deech's aunt, Helena Fraenkel, managed to pass a bundle of the silverware to Waniek for safekeeping, risking her life in doing so. Other Jews in the town were shot for refusing to hand over valuables to Nazis. Helena was murdered in the Belzec extermination camp. Waniek looked after the silver, at one stage burying it in his garden to hide it from the Nazis, which would have also been punishable by death. He never saw the Fraenkels again.

The story was uncovered by a neighbour of Waniek's, Marek Marko, and historian Professor Norman Davies in 2008. When Deech and her British family visited Waniek, he presented to them the silverware (and the tablecloth that bundled it) that he had kept in a drawer for 67 years. He died 8 months later, aged 102.

Deech has criticized Poland regarding its policy for compensation of goods stolen during German occupation. In May 2019, Deech claimed during a House of Lords debate that Poland is “squatting on property of 3 million Shoah victims” and that it was the "most egregious offender” when it came to returning Nazi loot”.

See also
 House of Lords, Crossbench Peers

References

External links

IVF to Immortality: Controversy in the Era of Reproductive Technology by Ruth Deech and Anna Smajdor, Oxford University Press, November 2007
 Office of the Independent Adjudicator for Higher Education (OIA)
 UK Bar Standards Board

1943 births
Living people
Alumni of St Anne's College, Oxford
Fellows of St Anne's College, Oxford
Principals of St Anne's College, Oxford
Brandeis University alumni
BBC Governors
British Jews
Dames Commander of the Order of the British Empire
People's peers
Life peeresses created by Elizabeth II
Crossbench life peers
People from Clapham
People educated at Christ's Hospital
Members of the European Academy of Sciences and Arts
Professors of Gresham College
Jewish British politicians